Japan has implemented several national animal welfare laws since 1973, but its protections for animals are considered weak by international standards. Animal activism and protection laws in Japan are mainly focused on the welfare of domesticated animals and farm animals.

History 
Buddhism was first introduced to Japan in the 6th century CE. A central teaching of Buddhism is ahimsa, or nonviolence towards all living things. Buddhist proscriptions against killing animals and encouragement of vegetarianism were highly influential throughout several periods of Japanese history.

In 675, Emperor Tenmu banned the consumption of meat with exceptions for fish and wild animals due to his devout Buddhism, though the ban seems to not have been well-observed.

Meat was reintroduced when Christian missionaries from Portugal and the Netherlands arrived in Japan beginning in the 16th century, bringing with them their omnivorous diets.

The ban on eating meat was reinstated in 1687 under the Buddhist Tokugawa shogunate. Killing animals was made illegal as well, leading to a rise in a black market for meat obtained through hunting.

Emperor Meiji repealed the ban on meat and began eating meat publicly at dinners with Westerners in 1872. The removal of the ban encountered resistance and in one notable reaction, ten monks attempted to break into the Imperial Palace. The monks asserted that due to foreign influence, large numbers of Japanese had begun eating meat and that this was "destroying the soul of the Japanese people." Several of the monks were killed during the break-in attempt, and the remainder were arrested.

The consumption of animal products has since become the norm in Japan, and has increased dramatically since the introduction of intensive animal farming in the 1950s.

Legislation 

Japan's main animal welfare law is the 1973 Act on Welfare and Management of Animals. The law makes it a crime to kill, injure, or inflict cruelty on animals without due cause. The welfare law also defines a duty of care in owners and keepers of animals to maintain the health and safety of the animals and to raise them accordingly with the individual's species and behavior. The law lists cattle, horses, pigs, sheep, goats, dogs, cats, domestic rabbits, chickens, domestic pigeons, domestic ducks, and any other animals which have an owner as protected. Any mammals, birds or reptiles with an owner are protected, with the notable exception of fish. The penalty for killing or injuring an animal in the protected category is a fine or imprisonment up to one year; abandonment and cruelty by neglect are punishable with fines.

With the exception of fish, all farm animals are protected by the anti-cruelty and duty of care provisions. Slaughters are required to minimize pain and distress, although appropriate methods are not specified and stunning is not required. The law’s regulations on animal-handling businesses exclude livestock and do not contain legislation specifically addressing farm animals.

The anti-cruelty and duty of care provisions also apply to animals in research. The law also stipulates that alternative methods must be considered as well as all possible reductions of the number of animals used. Methods of experimentation and sacrifice that minimize pain and distress are required to be used as much as possible. The law was amended in 2005 to create new basic guidelines for experimentation based on the Three Rs (refine, replace, reduce) for animal testing, although enforcement of the law still relies heavily on self-regulation.

In 2012, the law was amended to impose stricter regulations on sellers of dogs and cats, create measures for animal welfare during disasters, create clearer definitions of animal abuse, and expand duty of care beyond individual owners. The amendment stipulates that, "… every person shall maintain the environment and health of animals, shall feed and water animals properly by taking into account their natural habits and giving consideration to the symbiosis between humans and animals."

In 2020, Japan received a E out of possible grades A, B, C, D, E, F, G with A being the best possible score on World Animal Protection's (formerly World Society for the Protection of Animals) Animal Protection Index.

Animal issues

Animals used for food

Animal agriculture 
Veal crates, gestation crates, and battery cages are legal in Japan, as is cutting off tails, beaks, and fangs without anesthesia.

Beef production increased from 142,000 tons in 1960 to a peak of 602,000 tons in 1994, down to 490,000 tons in 2015. Poultry consumption rose from 74,000 tons to 1,375,000 tons in 2015, a twenty-fold increase. In 2015, Japan produced 1.185 million cattle and 17.15 million farmed swine across all of its farms. Over 823 million farm animals were slaughtered in Japan in 2010, roughly seven times the overall farm animal population.

Animal product consumption 
Japanese total meat consumption increased five-fold from the 1960s to 2000.

Japan is the second largest fish and seafood importer in the world, and the largest in Asia. Per capita consumption of fish and seafood declined from 40 kg in 2007 to 33 kg in 2012, partly due to a rise in meat and dairy consumption.

A 2014 survey by the Japanese organization Animal Rights Center found that 4.7% of respondents were vegetarians (including vegans).

Animal testing 

A 2009 survey found a total of 11,337,334 animals being maintained in Japanese laboratories. Cruelty Free International estimates that Japan ranks second in the world (behind the United States) in the number of animals used in experiments.

Testing cosmetics on animals is both legal and mandatory in Japan. Law requires that "quasi-drugs" such as skin-lightening products, suntan lotion, and hair growth tonics be tested on animals when new ingredients are added. Shiseido, Japan's largest cosmetics manufacturer, announced in 2013 that it would stop testing cosmetics on animals. In 2015, Humane Society International began leading a Be Cruelty-Free campaign to pressure the National Diet to ban testing cosmetics on animals.

Taiji dolphin drive hunt 

The Taiji dolphin drive hunt is an annual dolphin drive hunt that takes place in Taiji, Wakayama in Japan every year from September to March.

The hunt is performed by a select group of fishermen from the town. When a pod of dolphins has been spotted, fishing boats move into position. One end of a steel pipe is lowered into the water and the fisherman aboard the boats strike the pipe with mallets to confuse the dolphins' sonar.

The steel pipes are placed at strategic points around the pod in an effort to herd the dolphins toward the bay and a sheltered cove. Once enough dolphins have been herded into place, the fishermen quickly close off the area with nets to prevent the dolphins from escaping.

As the dolphins are initially quite agitated, they are left to calm down overnight. The following day, fishermen enter the bay in small boats and the dolphins are caught one at a time and killed. For centuries, primary method of dispatch was to cut the dolphins’ throats. This method grew controversial as it killed the dolphins by severing blood vessels, leading to death by exsanguination.

The Japanese government banned the previous method due to excessive suffering and now the officially sanctioned method requires a metal pin to be driven into the cervical region (neck) of the dolphin to sever the brainstem. Targeting the brain stem causes death within seconds, according to a memo from Senzo Uchida, the executive secretary of the Japan Cetacean Conference on Zoological Gardens and Aquariums.

According to an academic paper published in 2013 in the Journal of Applied Animal Welfare Science titled A Veterinary and Behavioral Analysis of Dolphin Killing Methods Currently Used in the 'Drive Hunt' in Taiji, Japan, the killing method involving driving a rod into the spine and using a pin to stop bleeding creates such terror and pain that it would be illegal to kill cows in Japan in the same manner. Several veterinarians and behavioral scientists evaluated the current Taiji Japanese killing method and concluded that, "This killing method […] would not be tolerated or permitted in any regulated slaughterhouse process in the developed world."

Exotic pets 
Japan has one of the largest markets for the exotic pet trade, threatening the survival of many wild species. Exotic animal cafes where wild animals are often kept in inappropriate conditions are found throughout the country. Asian small-clawed otters, a species native to south-east Asia whose international trade has been banned by CITES, are especially popular with social media blamed for driving demand.

Organizations 

The Animal Rights Center works on issues involving the welfare of stray animals and opposes animal testing, fur farming, and meat-eating through demonstrations, lectures, and the distribution of educational material.

VegeProject Japan also focuses on farmed animal issues, but through encouraging companies and institutions to incorporate plant-based options. VegeProject began as a college project to start vegan options at Kyoto University and has since had similar success in Tokyo University, Hitotsubashi University, Nagoya University, and Kobe University, among others. The organization has since branched out to collaborate with companies through their vegan certification program, including with household names such as Kikkoman, Kagome, Nippn, Marukome, and Marusanai. According to their website, VegeProject's goal is to create a society where vegan options can be accessed anywhere.

The Japanese Animal Welfare Society (JAWS) UK can be traced to an organization founded in Tokyo in 1945 by British expatriates. Its original aim was to improve the welfare of dogs used for experiments. At the time, dogs were kept in poor conditions and used in unregulated in vivo tests. Officially founded in the United Kingdom, JAWS UK continued to assist efforts to help these dogs and other animals, eventually founding a JAWS based in Japan. Its current activities include funding vital animal welfare equipment such as veterinary drugs and humane cat traps, providing general funds for local animal welfare groups, and promoting the Five Freedoms for Japanese animals.

According to Honjo (2014), Japanese animal welfare organizations focus on companion animals, paying little attention to farmed animals.

See also 
Whaling in Japan
Timeline of animal welfare and rights
History of vegetarianism
Animal rights movement
Animal protectionism
2002 Japan animal cruelty case

References